Surihuiri, Sorehuire or Surihuire is a  mountain in the Chila mountain range in the Andes of Peru. It is located in the Arequipa Region, Caylloma Province, in the districts Lari, Madrigal and Tapay. Surihuiri lies north of the Colca River, northwest of the mountains Mismi, Quehuisha and Jatunpila and south of Minaspata. Some of the nearest villages are Tambomayo and Surihuire.

See also 
 Huallatane

References

Mountains of Peru
Mountains of Arequipa Region